James Edward Burrows (born December 30, 1940), sometimes known as Jim "Jimmy" Burrows, is an American television director who has been working in television since the 1970s. Burrows has directed over 50 television pilots and co-created the television series Cheers. He has also formed 3 Sisters Entertainment, a joint venture with NBC that is known for Will & Grace as well as the CBS Productions show Caroline in the City.

In 2016, Burrows directed his 1,000th TV episode, on NBC's Crowded.

Early life
Burrows was born to a Jewish family in Los Angeles, California, the son of Ruth (Levinson) and Abe Burrows, a well-known composer, director and writer. James has one sister, Laurie Burrows Grad. When James was still a young child, his family moved to New York where James attended New York’s High School of Music & Art. Burrows is a graduate of Oberlin College and the graduate program of the Yale School of Drama.

Career

Early career
After Yale, Burrows returned to California where he became employed as a dialogue coach on O.K. Crackerby!, a television series starring Burl Ives and created by Burrows' father, Abe. Burrows then took a job as an assistant stage manager on the play Holly Golightly, an adaptation of the novella Breakfast at Tiffany's. The production was unsuccessful, but the job served as Burrows' introduction to its star, Mary Tyler Moore. Early on Burrows also worked for the road company of Cactus Flower and the Broadway production of Forty Carats. He also went to direct the short lived Broadway play The Castro Complex.

Burrows continued working in theater as a stage manager and transitioned into directing plays. Burrows directed traveling plays and a production at a Jacksonville, Florida dinner theater.

Television director
While working in theater, Burrows wrote Moore and her then husband Grant Tinker seeking a job at their production company, MTM Enterprises. In 1974, Tinker hired Burrows as a director for MTM Enterprises where he directed episodes of The Mary Tyler Moore Show and The Bob Newhart Show. Tinker asked director Jay Sandrich, known for his work directing The Mary Tyler Moore Show and later The Cosby Show and The Golden Girls, to serve as a mentor to Burrows.

Burrows is best known for his comic timing, complex blocking for actors, and incorporating more sophisticated lighting in television studio shoots. He is also credited as being one of the first sitcom directors to increase the typical multi-camera television shoot from three to four cameras.

Cheers
Burrows co-created Cheers with brothers Glen and Les Charles. The Charles brothers were also former employees of MTM Enterprises and served as producers on the series Taxi where Burrows worked as in-house director for 76 episodes. Burrows and the Charles brothers wanted to create a show where they could have more control. Cheers premiered on NBC on September 30, 1982. Although Cheers initially struggled in the ratings, the series became a hit, running 275 episodes over eleven seasons. Burrows directed all but 35 of those 275 episodes.

Other television series
Burrows has directed for many series, including:

1970s – Phyllis, Rhoda, Laverne & Shirley, Busting Loose, The Ted Knight Show, The Associates, On Our Own
1980s – The Hogan Family, Dear John, Night Court
1990s – Wings, Frasier, Friends, NewsRadio, 3rd Rock from the Sun, Pearl, Dharma & Greg, Caroline in the City, Will & Grace, George and Leo
2000s – The Class, Courting Alex, Two and a Half Men, Back to You, The Big Bang Theory, Gary Unmarried, Hank
2010s – Romantically Challenged, Mike & Molly, Better with You, $#*! My Dad Says, 2 Broke Girls, Partners, The Millers, Sean Saves the World, Friends with Better Lives, Crowded, Man with a Plan, Superior Donuts, Disjointed, Will & Grace (revival)

Burrows directed every episode of Will & Grace during its initial eight-year run. Additionally, by 2012 Burrows had directed over 50 pilots for television series.

Burrows has directed over 1,000 episodes of television, a milestone he achieved in November 2015 with the NBC sitcom Crowded. To celebrate Burrows' achievement, NBC aired a special tribute on February 21, 2016, titled Must See TV: An All-Star Tribute to James Burrows featuring cast reunions from many of the series Burrows has directed such as Cheers, Taxi, Friends, Frasier, The Big Bang Theory, Will & Grace and Mike & Molly. In January 2020, Andy Fisher and Burrows won the Directors Guild of America Award for Variety/Talk/News/Sports - Specials for Live in Front of a Studio Audience: Norman Lear's All in the Family and The Jeffersons.

Other projects
In 1998, Burrows directed a Chicago-based production of the 1939 comedy The Man Who Came to Dinner starring John Mahoney.

In front of the camera
Burrows has had cameo appearances in several of the shows for which he has directed. In the first season of Friends, Burrows appeared in the episode "The One with the Butt" as the director of the film in which the character Joey Tribbiani is cast as Al Pacino's "butt double". He also appears as a television director named Jimmy in the 2005 HBO series The Comeback. Burrows played himself on the series. An episode of Scrubs, "My Life in Four Cameras", had a character named Charles James in honor of Cheers creators Burrows and Glen and Les Charles. It was previously asserted in Sitcoms: the 101 Greatest TV Comedies of All Time (2007) that Burrows served as the silhouette of the customer who knocks on the door in the final scene of Cheers, but Burrows himself refuted this claim on episode 9 of the NewsRadio-themed podcast Dispatches from Fort Awesome, revealing that the actual "Man Who Knocks" was agent Bob Broder.

Awards
Over the course of his career, Burrows has been nominated for fifteen Directors Guild of America awards, and for an Emmy Award every year between 1980 and 2005, excluding 1997. Burrows has won eleven Emmy Awards and five Directors Guild of America Awards.  The Academy of Television Arts and Sciences celebrated Burrows' forty-year career by hosting a panel in his honor on October 7, 2013.

Personal life
Burrows is married to celebrity hairstylist Debbie Easton; the couple lives in Manhattan. Burrows was previously married to Linda Solomon. He has three daughters and one stepdaughter.

Selected filmography

Acting

Television

Non-acting

Film

Television

References

External links

 

1940 births
Living people
Oberlin College alumni
Yale School of Drama alumni
20th-century American Jews
American television directors
American television writers
Directors Guild of America Award winners
Film directors from Los Angeles
Primetime Emmy Award winners
Showrunners
The High School of Music & Art alumni
Film directors from New York City
Screenwriters from New York (state)
Screenwriters from California
21st-century American Jews
Jewish American television producers